Mary Elizabeth Clarke  (December 3, 1924 – June 10, 2011) was a United States Army officer who was the department head of the Women's Army Corps. She became major general in the United States Army and was the first woman to obtain this rank. She served in the United States Army for thirty six years, the longest ever served for a woman in the United States Army. In 1978 Norwich University awarded her an honorary doctorate in military science. She retired in 1981 and was on the  Women in the Services Defense Advisory Committee.

Early life and schooling 
Clarke was born on December 3, 1924, in Rochester, New York. She attended the Rochester Immaculate Conception School and the Rochester West High School. She was given the nickname of Betty when in her twenties.

Career
Clarke's first job was as a secretary and later as a defense worker. When she was twenty one years old she enlisted at Fort Des Moines, Iowa, in the Women's Army Corps (WAC) in August 1945, just before World War II ended. She thought she was only going to serve until the end of the war. She was commissioned into the WAC Officer Candidate Course and a commander from an all-male regiment thought it was inconceivable she would even get through the basic training. Clarke made it through the initial training and decided to remain in the army. She served in the enlisted ranks for an additional four years. Clarke did her training at Fort Des Moines Provisional Army Officer Training School located in Iowa. Upon completion she was then assigned as a supply sergeant at Camp Stoneman, California. In 1948 she was given orders to go to Berlin, Germany. There she was with the Berlin Brigade in the middle of the Berlin Airlift crisis.

Clarke's next assignments were at the United States Army Chemical Center and Valley Forge General Hospital. Clarke then did recruitment duty for a year. She attended the WAC Officer Candidate School at Camp Lee and after the schooling in September 1949 she became a WAC commissioned officer as a second lieutenant. Then she went to Tokyo to become a commanding officer at a WAC unit and was there for two years before leaving to go to the United States. She held officer's positions in Texas, Alabama, Maryland, California and Washington, D.C. from 1958 through 1971.

Clarke was given duties at the Office of Equal Opportunity and Deputy Chief of Staff for Personnel in Washington, D.C. and did WAC consulting in preparation of historical books. She reached the rank of colonel in 1972 and became the commander of the United States WAC Center and School in Fort McClellan. Clarke became the department director of the WAC Advisory Office in 1974. In 1975 she became brigadier general and the leader of the WAC. She had special training at the United States Military Academy Preparatory School in 1976 to have women qualify to attend military academies, since it was then allowed for women to attend these academies which came about through a federal directive of President Gerald Ford.

Clarke was at the WAC from 1975 to 1978 as the last executive, as it was dissolved at the end of her administration. After this assignment she was given the rank of a two-star general and promoted to major general in November 1978. She then immediately became commander of the United States Army Military Police School and Training Center. During her tenure, in 1979 she oversaw the return of the United States Army Chemical School from the Aberdeen Proving Ground near Edgewood, Maryland to its former home at Fort McClellan by the city of Anniston, Alabama. Now with three major missions, a basic Training Brigade, the Army Military Police School and the Army Chemical School, she became commander of the United States Army Military Police and Chemical Schools, Training Center, Fort McClellan, Alabama. It was the first time a woman commanded a major military installation. Clarke was the first woman to achieve the class of major general in the United States Army in 1978. In 1980 she was the first woman to complete 35 years of continuous active military service in the United States. She served in the army for a total thirty six years, retiring in 1981. This is the longest service ever served for a woman.

Later life and death

Clarke in 1980 was in charge of human resources for the Deputy Chief of Staff in Washington, D.C. and was there until she went into retirement in 1981. In 1984 she was appointed by the Secretary of Defense to Women in the Services Defense Advisory Committee. She was elevated to Vice Chair in 1986. In 1989 she became a member, later Chair, of the Advisory Committee on Women Veterans. In 1992, she was a member of the Presidential Commission on the Assignment of Women in the Armed Forces. Clarke died June 10, 2011, in San Antonio, Texas and is buried at the Ft Sam Houston National Cemetery in Bexar County, Texas.

Award and decorations

Clarke earned the Distinguished Service Medal, Legion of Merit, and Meritorious Service Medal with Oak Leaf Cluster. Her uniform was exhibited in a Pentagon display commemorating vital contributions of Army women pioneers.

Promotions
 Enlisted – August 10, 1945
  Second lieutenant – September 29, 1949
  First lieutenant – September 7, 1953
  Captain – April 30, 1954
  Major – October 5, 1961
  Lieutenant colonel – November 24, 1965
  Colonel – 1972
  Brigadier general – 1975
  Major general – June 1978

Notes

Bibliography
 
 
 
 
 
 

1924 births
2011 deaths
American women civil servants
Female generals of the United States Army
Military personnel from Rochester, New York
Recipients of the Legion of Merit
Burials at Fort Sam Houston National Cemetery
21st-century American women